The 1938–39 season was Mansfield Town's eighth season in the Football League and third in the Third Division South, they finished in 16th position with 39 points.

Final league table

Results

Football League Third Division South

FA Cup

Football League Third Division South Cup

Squad statistics
 Squad list sourced from

References
General
 Mansfield Town 1938–39 at soccerbase.com (use drop down list to select relevant season)

Specific

Mansfield Town F.C. seasons
Mansfield Town